Beaumont station is an Amtrak station in Beaumont, Texas, served by the Sunset Limited service.

Station buildings 
The current station building and adjacent police substation were constructed in 2012 and opened on September 14 of that year.  An earlier station building on the site sustained damage in Hurricane Rita in 2005. That building was removed and only a concrete platform was left for six years until the current replacement station was built. A portion of the construction funds for the current station was from $1.2 million in federal stimulus funding.  Work was completed in January, 2012. The station is constructed of red brick and has an enclosed waiting room. A  platform was also constructed.

The city of Beaumont built a police substation with public restrooms on the site adjacent to the current train station at the same time.

Public transportation 
Public transportation is accessible with the Beaumont Municipal Transit System. Route #4 – South Eleventh runs south of the Amtrak station with a stop on Fannin Street. The transit system provides ten routes traveling throughout the city. Each of the routes travel to the Dannebaum Station transit center providing a central transfer spot.

Notable places nearby 
Downtown Beaumont
Jefferson Theatre – The theater, listed on the National Register of Historic Places, was built in 1927.  The theater was completely renovated in the early 2000s.  Performances are at the theater throughout the year.
Beaumont Civic Center – Located about two blocks away from the Jefferson, the civic center has a capacity of 6,500.  Various events are held throughout the year.  The civic center is located adjacent to Riverfront Park.  The park is between the civic center grounds and the Neches River.
Julie Rogers Theater – The Julie Rogers theater, a contributing building of the Beaumont Commercial District U.S. Historic district is located across the street from the civic center.  Live performances are held throughout the year.
Texas Energy Museum – The Texas Energy Museum is across the street from the Julie Rogers Theater.  The two stories of exhibits provide and entertaining and educational look at the petroleum industry with a concentration on the Spindletop oil field.
Tyrrell Historical Library – The Tyrrell Historical Library is next door to the energy museum.  The library building, another contributing building to the Beaumont Commercial District Historic district, was originally a church.  The renovated building houses genealogy records and other archives.
Art Museum of Southeast Texas – Across the plaza from the energy museum and historical library is the Art Museum of Southeast Texas.  The art museum has a permanent collection of over one thousand (1,000) pieces.  Rotating collections are also presented.
Crockett Street Entertainment District – The Crockett Street Entertainment District is two blocks away from the art museum.  Several restaurants and other entertainment businesses are located in the district.  The district consists of a block of restored buildings.  Each of the buildings are contributing members of the Beaumont Commercial District Historical district.
Edison Museum – Two blocks away from the entertainment district, the museum is housed in a building dating back to 1927.  The building was originally a power substation.  It now houses artifacts associated with and concentrating on Thomas Edison.  The museum is the only one of its kind west of the Mississippi.
Fire Museum of Texas – The fire museum is two blocks away from both the Edison Museum and the Crockett Entertainment District.  It has a collection of antique fire fighting equipment including trucks.  The world's largest operating fire hydrant is in front of the museum building.  The building was built in 1927 and was originally a fire station.

The house is listed on the National Register of Historic Places. The  home includes furnishings original to the house. Also open for tours is a carriage house and gymnasium.
Lamar University – Lamar University is located in the southern part of the city.  In addition to NCAA Division I athletic events, the Dishman Art Museum is located on the campus.  The art museum has numerous permanent collections.
Spindletop-Gladys City Boomtown Museum – The museum is located on the campus of Lamar University.  In addition to the visitor center, the museum features a collection of fifteen replicated buildings which were part of Gladys City during the time of the Spindletop oil boom.  Several artifacts are in the buildings.

References

External links 

Amtrak Stations Database
Amtrak Photo Archive
Beaumont Municipal Transit System

Amtrak stations in Texas
Buildings and structures in Beaumont, Texas
Transportation in Jefferson County, Texas
Former Southern Pacific Railroad stations